Graham Francis Defries is a partner in the law firm Goodwin Procter. He is the co-creator with Alexander Williams of the Queens Counsel (comic strip) featured in the law pages of The Times since 1993.

Personal life

Defries earned his B.A. at Oxford Brookes University in 1990 and went to the University of Law to take the Bar Vocational Course in 1991.

He currently resides in London with his wife Emma Jane Pauline Defries and 4 children, Charles Samuel Nicholas Defries, Elisa Jane Catherine Defries, Lara Betty Maureen Defries and Arthur Joseph Graham Defries.

References

External links
 / Graham Defries at Goodwin Procter LLP
 Queens Counsel cartoon strip at The Times Online

Comic strip cartoonists
Living people
Lawyers from London
Alumni of Oxford Brookes University
Alumni of The University of Law
20th-century English lawyers
21st-century English lawyers
Year of birth missing (living people)